The  is a dam on the Kodomari River, located in the town of Nakadomari, Kitatsugaru District, Aomori Prefecture in the Tohoku region of Japan.

The dam is a concrete gravity dam across the Kodomari River. It is  multipurpose dam to provide water for irrigation, flood control and drinking water.

External links

Ministry of Land, Infrastructure, Transport and Tourism

Dams in Aomori Prefecture
Dams completed in 1996
Nakadomari, Aomori